Kalatak (also Romanized as Kalātak; also known as Kalātak-e Kūh-e Pā’īn) is a village in Siyahu Rural District, Fin District, Bandar Abbas County, Hormozgan Province, Iran. At the 2006 census, its population was 17, in 4 families.

References 

Populated places in Bandar Abbas County